The Australian Consulate-General in Noumea, New Caledonia represents the Commonwealth of Australia in New Caledonia, a special collectivity of France, and is also accredited to the Pacific French Overseas collectivity of Wallis and Futuna (Australia's relations with French Polynesia are now handled by a separate consulate-general since 2021). The Consul-General also serves as Australia's representative to the Noumea-based Pacific Community. The Consulate-General, one of four in New Caledonia (alongside New Zealand, Indonesia and Vanuatu), has since 1976 had its offices at 19 avenue du Maréchal Foch, Nouméa.

The Australian Consulate-General in Nouméa reports directly to the Department of Foreign Affairs and Trade in Canberra, Australia, just as the Australian embassies and high commissions around the world and is Australia's fourth-oldest diplomatic posting (after London, 1910; Ottawa, 1939; and Washington, February 1940), having been established on 6 August 1940, when Bertram Ballard was posted to Nouméa. The consulate celebrated its 75th anniversary on 6 August 2015.

Consulate history
First established on 6 August 1940 with the appointment of Bertram Ballard as Official Representative of the Commonwealth Government in Nouméa, Ballard's responsibilities included the "full power and authority on behalf of the Commonwealth Government to conduct discussions and/or to agree and conclude with the administration of New Caledonia any matters or agreements that may tend to the attainment of co-operation in 'the struggle against the Berlin-Rome Axis at the side of Great Britain' and to sign for an on behalf of the Commonwealth Government everything so agreed upon and concluded". However, the time of Ballard's appointment meant that the real reason for his appointment was to report to Canberra the situation inside the French colony, including the political sympathies of the colonial administration. The administration in Nouméa at the time was decidedly pro-Vichy French, but the Australian Government continued to be hesitant in encouraging a takeover of the colony or encouraging Free French elements in the colony.

However, Ballard's report of 8 September 1940 noted that the provisional Governor, Colonel Denis, was not likely to be accommodating to a settlement in any case and that the people of the colony would "welcome and follow" a Governor appointed by De Gaulle, spurred the Australian Government, led by Minister for External Affairs, John McEwen, into action. This action culminated in the sending of HMAS Adelaide to escort Free French Governor-designate Henri Sautot to Nouméa, bringing the colony to Free France on 19 September.

With the end of the war, the Official Representative's Office was upgraded to a Consulate, and the first consul appointed was Harold Stuart Barnett, appointed on 18 December 1945. From then until 20 February 1980, the agency was known as the Australian Consulate, when posting was upgraded to a Consulate-General.

1987 recall incident
In January 1987, the French Government declared the serving Australian Consul-General, John Dauth, as "persona non grata", prompting his recall from the posting. The reasoning the French Government (represented by Minister for Overseas Departments and Territories, Bernard Pons) gave for Dauth's recall was that he "had provided aid to extremist members of the pro-independence
FLNKS group which had links with Libya", an accusation that was firmly repudiated by Foreign Minister Bill Hayden, who called in the French representative in Canberra to register an official protest.

Hayden had noted that "Mr Dauth has done no more than the Australian Government expects of any government official representing its interests overseas" and it was reported that his recall had been motivated by a recent breakdown in Australia–France relations, particularly over the future of New Caledonia. On 5 January France had suspended ministerial contacts with Australia because of their support for efforts at the United Nations to have New Caledonia put back on the United Nations list of non-self-governing territories (it had been removed from the list in 1947) and added to the Decolonisation List, which were successful in a resolution of the UN General Assembly of 2 December 1986. France's actions to expel Dauth and its reasoning for doing so were also criticised by the governments of Fiji, Papua New Guinea and Vanuatu's Prime Minister, Walter Lini, who noted that "the French Government's reaction after its defeat on the United Nations vote ... could be said to be undiplomatic, childish, naive and reactionary".

French Polynesia
From 1990 to 2021, there existed an Honorary Consulate in Papeete, French Polynesia, held from 2002 to 2021 by Marc Siu, who reported to the consulate-general in Nouméa. In May 2021, Australian Foreign Minister Marise Payne announced the establishment of an Australian Consulate-General in French Polynesia, upgrading the Australian representation there as part of an expansion of the country's diplomatic presence in the Pacific region that included appointing official representation to every member of the Pacific Islands Forum. Claire Scott was appointed on the same day as the new consul-general.

Office-holders

Consuls-general in Papeete, French Polynesia

See also
 Australia–France relations

References

External links

 Australian Consulate-General Noumea, New Caledonia - Wallis and Futuna
 Australian Consulate-General, Papeete, French Polynesia

Australia–France relations
 
Noumea
Australia
Nouméa
French Polynesia
Pacific Community
1940 establishments in New Caledonia